James Kerby Neill (1906 - 21 August 1996) was professor emeritus of English at The Catholic University of America, Washington, D.C.,  He was an author and researcher with a  Ph.D. in Shakespearean studies
He was born in 1906 to Charles Patrick Neill (b. 1865 in Rock Island, IL) and Esther A. Waggaman (b. 1874 in Washington, D.C.), married Julia Day Stewart (b. 1913).    He was a graduate of Georgetown Preparatory School and Georgetown University, and received a doctorate in English literature from Johns Hopkins University.

He taught at St. Louis University and the College of New Rochelle before joining Catholic University in 1938.  
He was chairman of the English department from 1962 to 1969 and retired in 1974.  He was a January 1965 recipient of the Benemerenti Medal bestowed by the University's rector on behalf of Pope Paul VI, for  his 25+ years’ service to the University.
During his tenure at Catholic University he was on the Academic Freedom committee and the Budget Committee of the Academic Senateand was appointed head of a committee from the Academic Senate, to review the University's handling and discussion of the Papal encyclical Humane Vitae, and whether it met standards for academic freedom under the AAUP.

Neill served on the board of directors of the William J. Kerby Foundation, a national organization founded in 1941, dedicated to promoting the fundamental principle of the dignity of man, focusing attention on the spiritual basis of democracy, encouraging Americans to put this spiritual concept of democracy to practical use in the fields of education, social service, public administration, labor and industrial relations, and developing a strong, alert, and active lay leadership.  His father, the prominent Charles P. Neill, and also a faculty member of Catholic University,  had been officially elected its honorary president on April 26, 1942, the same day it adopted its constitution and by-laws.
Neill died August 21, 1996, at a nursing home in Elk Grove Village, Illinois.

References 

1906 births
1996 deaths
Catholic University of America School of Arts and Sciences faculty
Georgetown University alumni
Johns Hopkins University alumni
Saint Louis University faculty
Recipients of the Benemerenti medal